Come Out and Play is the fourth studio album by American heavy metal band Twisted Sister, released by Atlantic Records on November 22, 1985. The album was significantly less successful than its predecessor Stay Hungry (1984), both critically and commercially, although it achieved Gold status by selling more than 500,000 copies.

Overview
Following the massive success of 1984's Stay Hungry which established Twisted Sister as one of the world's top recording acts, the band was faced with the question of whether they should continue in the same MTV and radio-friendly direction that brought them so much success, or return to their heavy metal roots. Come Out and Play saw them attempt to do both, but the approach ultimately proved devastatingly unsuccessful and the album marked the beginning of the band's commercial decline. 

The band's decision to record a cover of the 1964 Shangri-Las' hit "Leader of the Pack" and release it as the album's first single proved very unpopular with the band's fanbase. Ultimately, neither "Leader of the Pack" nor second single "Be Chrool To Your Scuel" (featuring guest appearances from artists such as Alice Cooper, Brian Setzer, Clarence Clemons and Billy Joel) came close to matching the success of "We're Not Gonna Take It" or "I Wanna Rock" from 1984's Stay Hungry.

The 1986 world tour in support of Come Out and Play was a fiasco, marked by low attendance and ticket sales so low in some cities that several shows were simply canceled. Longtime drummer A.J. Pero left the band following the tour in 1986, contributing to the chaos which eventually saw Twisted Sister disband in 1988.

The music videos for "Leader of the Pack" and "Be Chrool to Your School" followed the same comedic formula which had been so successful for the band in the Stay Hungry era. The latter single, featuring a prominent guest spot by Dee Snider's hero Alice Cooper, was banned by MTV on the grounds that it was offensive. The band didn't produce a video for the album's final single, "You Want What We Got".

In 1986 the band released the Come Out and Play: The Videos home video on VHS, which included four videos ("We're Not Gonna Take It", "I Wanna Rock", "Leader of the Pack" and "Be Chrool to Your Scuel") tied together by scenes of Snider in a scrapyard being visited by troubled teens seeking advice, to the tune of the song "Come Out and Play". This home video has never been re-issued on DVD.

The intro to the title track features an homage to the 1979 cult classic movie The Warriors, in which the main villain, Luther, chants "Warriors, come out to play".

Track listing

Personnel

Twisted Sister
 Dee Snider – lead vocals, backing vocals
 Eddie "Fingers" Ojeda – lead & rhythm guitars, backing vocals
 Jay Jay French – rhythm & lead guitars, backing vocals
 Mark "The Animal" Mendoza – bass, backing vocals
 A. J. Pero – drums, percussion

Additional musicians
 Alan St. John – keyboards
 Don Dokken, Gary Holland – backing vocals
 Alice Cooper – co-lead vocals on "Be Chrool to Your Scuel"
 Brian Setzer – guitar solo on "Be Chrool to Your Scuel"
 Billy Joel – piano on "Be Chrool to Your Scuel"
 Clarence Clemons – saxophone solo on "Be Chrool to Your Scuel"
 The Uptown Horns:
 Crispin Cioe – baritone saxophone on "Be Chrool to Your Scuel"
 Arno "Cool-Ray" Hecht – tenor saxophone on "Be Chrool to Your Scuel"
 "Bad" Bob Funk – trombone on "Be Chrool to Your Scuel"
 "Hollywood" Paul Litteral – trumpet on "Be Chrool to Your Scuel"
 Julia Waters, Maxine Waters – backing vocals on "Be Chrool to Your Scuel"

Production
 Dieter Dierks – producer, LP audio mastering
 Eddy Delana – sound engineer
 Craig Engel – assistant engineer in Los Angeles
 Craig Vogel – assistant engineer in New York
 Bob Ludwig – LP audio mastering
 Mikael Kirke – art director
 Mark Weiss – art director, photographer
 Barry Diament – CD audio mastering

Video guest stars
The following people appeared only in the song's official video:
 The comedian Bobcat Goldthwait
 The make-up artist Tom Savini
 Actor Luke Perry

Charts

Album

Singles

Certifications

References

External links
 Album lyrics from Twisted Sister's official website

Twisted Sister albums
1985 albums
Atlantic Records albums
Albums produced by Dieter Dierks